Restaurant Vermeer is a restaurant located in the NH Barbizon Palace hotel at the Prins Hendrikkade in Amsterdam, Netherlands. It is a fine dining restaurant that received its first Michelin star in 1993. It later lost and regained its star, then scored two stars in 2003.

The restaurant occupies (parts of) four of the nineteen 17th-century houses and fifteenth-century chapel that make up the NH Barbizon Palace hotel.

Head chefs 
Over the years Restaurant Vermeer had several Head chefs:
 Gert-Jan Hageman, 1993
 Ron Schouwenburg, 1994–1997
 Edwin Kats, 1997–2000
 Pascal Jalhaij, 2001–2004
 Christopher Naylor, 2004 to present

Star history 
1993–2000: one star
2001: no stars
2002: one star
2003–2004: two stars
2005–2007: one star
2008–2010: no stars
2011–2012: one star

Because Michelin awards its stars to the head chef, a restaurant normally loses its stars when a head chef leaves.

References 

Restaurants in Amsterdam
Michelin Guide starred restaurants in the Netherlands